The 2020 GP de Plouay featured as the third round of the 2020 UCI Women's World Tour and was held on 25 August 2020, in Plouay, France. The race was held on the same day as the men's Bretagne Classic, during the 2020 European Road Championships which were also held in Plouay.

Teams
176 riders from 18 teams started the race. Each team has a maximum of six riders. 76 riders finished the race within the time limit. 

UCI Women's WorldTeams

 
 
 
 
 
 
 
 

UCI Women's Continental Teams

Results

References

External links
 Official site

GP de Plouay
GP de Plouay
GP de Plouay
GP de Plouay